Sergio Mora is an American boxer.

Sergio Mora may also refer to:
Sergio Mora (born 1942), American soccer forward
Sergio Mora (born 1979), Spanish football midfielder